Antonio Brancaccio (26 August 1923 – 26 August 1995) was an Italian judge.

Background
Antonio Brancaccio was born on 26 August 1923 in Maddaloni, Campania.

He served as President of the Supreme Court of Cassation from 20 November 1986 to 16 January 1995 and as Minister of the Interior in the Dini Cabinet from 17 January 1995 to 8 June 1995. He resigned for health reasons and died a few months later - on his 72nd birthday - in a clinic of Göttingen, in Germany, where he was being treated for a brain tumor.

References

1923 births
1995 deaths
20th-century Italian judges
Italian Ministers of the Interior